The boys' snowboard cross event at the 2016 Winter Youth  Olympics took place on 15 February 2016 at the Hafjell Freepark.

Results

Qualification
The qualification was held at 9:30.

Group heats

Semifinals
Heat 1

Heat 2

Finals
The final was held at 11:38.
Small final

Big final

References

 

Snowboarding at the 2016 Winter Youth Olympics